Richard Bresee is a Canadian politician, who was elected to the Legislative Assembly of Ontario in the 2022 provincial election. He represents the riding of Hastings—Lennox and Addington as a member of the Progressive Conservative Party of Ontario.

Bresee was previously the mayor of Loyalist Township and the warden (in 2022) of Lennox and Addington County. Before that, he served as an instructor at St. Lawrence College and as an Associate Director of University Hospitals Kingston Foundation.

References 

Living people
Progressive Conservative Party of Ontario MPPs
21st-century Canadian politicians
Mayors of places in Ontario
People from Lennox and Addington County
Year of birth missing (living people)